Charles Sheffield Kelsey (October 7, 1822 – June 18, 1901) was an American mechanic, printer, and politician. He represented Marquette County as a member of the Wisconsin State Senate and the Wisconsin State Assembly.

Biography
Kelsey was born on October 7, 1822 in Perry, New York. His older brother, William H. Kelsey, was a member of the United States House of Representatives and his younger brother, Edwin B. Kelsey, was also a member of the Assembly and the Senate.

Before moving to Montello, Wisconsin, in 1854, Kelsey married Lucretia Bacon in 1840. They had four children before her death in 1869. Among them were Otto Kelsey, who became a member of the New York State Assembly, and Julia Kelsey, who became Postmistress of Montello.

Career
Kelsey was a member of the Senate from 1862 to 1864 and of the Assembly in 1867, 1873 and 1880. He was a Republican before and after the American Civil War, but was elected on the National Union Party ticket for his 1863–1864 senate term and his 1867 assembly term.

Kelsey died in Montello on June 18, 1901, and his remains were taken to Geneseo, New York for burial.

References

1822 births
Republican Party members of the Wisconsin State Assembly
People from Montello, Wisconsin
People from Perry, New York
Republican Party Wisconsin state senators
1901 deaths
19th-century American politicians